Covert Coup is a collaboration studio album by rapper Curren$y and producer The Alchemist. The album featured guest appearances from rappers Prodigy of Mobb Deep, Freddie Gibbs, Smoke DZA and Fiend and contains 10 songs. Covert Coup was created as a retail EP. Later, the artists decided to release it as a free digital album. It was still treated as a mixtape, however, since it was given away for free. On April 7, 2011, the first single from Covert Coup titled "Ventilation" was leaked onto the internet. "Full Metal" was leaked on April 12. On April 15, the third single entitled "Scottie Pippen" featuring Freddie Gibbs, was leaked. The album was released by Curren$y on April 20, 2011, via his Twitter. On May 8, 2012, The Alchemist released Covert Coup Instrumentals, a projects that includes the Instrumental version of every track in the album.

Track listing 
All tracks produced by The Alchemist.

References

External links

2011 albums
Albums produced by the Alchemist (musician)
Currensy albums
The Alchemist (musician) albums